Eastbourne railway station serves the seaside town of Eastbourne in East Sussex, England. It is on the East Coastway Line. The station is managed by Southern, who operate all trains serving it. It is one of two railway stations in the town, the other being Hampden Park Station. There are also two other stations in the Eastbourne area, one being Pevensey & Westham, in nearby Westham (near Pevensey), the other being Polegate.

Most passenger services along the coast served the station, as they do today.  Trains reverse at the station to continue their journey along the East Coastway by using a junction north of Hampden Park railway station; services run either east (to Bexhill, Hastings and Ashford International) or west via Lewes (to Brighton or London Victoria) from the station.

History
The single track branch line to Eastbourne from Polegate on the Brighton to Hastings line was opened by the London Brighton and South Coast Railway (LB&SCR) on 14 May 1849. As the town became an ever more popular seaside resort two further stations followed: the first in 1866 and the present station, designed by F.D. Brick, in 1886. There was a rarely used triangular junction between Polegate and the now-closed Stone Cross which allowed trains to bypass the Branch; the track for this has now been lifted.

First station
Very little is known about the first station, except it was a timber structure and was used between 1849 and 1866 when the station building was moved to Wharf Road and became a dwelling for railway families. A new station was rebuilt. The location of the first station was said to be in Upperton Road, between the site of the current station and the Royal Mail sorting office. There is no record known on how many platforms the first station had.

Present station

With the increase in services serving Eastbourne, now a popular resort, under LB&SCR Chief Engineer Frederick Banister a station was resited a little to the east in 1872 and rebuilt in 1886 and designed by F.D. Brick, in 1886. which a vaulted canopy and lantern roof, similar to Lewes. The station had 4 platforms which increased in length over the years. There were also two run around loops between platforms 2 and 3. Over the years one of the runaround loops was lost as platforms 1 and 2 was built wider. On 12 April 1977 platform 4 was shortened from a 12 coach to an 8 coach length to make way for the ring road construction. It was then taken out of use and the track lifted during the Eastbourne re-signalling in 1991

Goods station and yards
A goods station and yard was built north of the present station, on the site of the first station and was accessed from the mainline north of the station. Also to the north of the station was an extensive coal depot and industrial sidings including the Crumbles siding. The goods shed still survives today as the Enterprise Shopping Centre and the goods yard surrounding it is now the station car park. The site of the former coal sidings to the northeast of the station is now occupied by a car dealership.

Locomotive depot

The LB&SCR opened a small engine shed in 1849 which was demolished in 1876. It was replaced by a semi-roundhouse in 1876, which was demolished in 1912. A larger, seven-road (seven track) shed was opened in 1911, but this was badly damaged by bombing in the Second World War and was never repaired. The shed was closed in 1952, but the site continued to be used as a store for locomotives awaiting scrapping until 1965, when diesel locomotives were stored there until 1968; the shed was demolished in 1969.
The site of the first engine shed is now occupied by the current carriage sidings, whilst the site of the later shed is now wasteland.

Signal Box

The current signal box was built in 1882 and had an impressive 108 Lever frame controlling the station, goods yard and carriage sidings, this was later replaced on 14 November 1934 with a 72 lever frame. 
In 1991 the signal box was changed into a power signal box when the semaphore signals were replaced by colour light signals and an "entrance-exit" control system installed. 
The signal box closed in 2015 with the re-signalling of the line between Lewes and Bexhill controlled from a new signalling centre at Three Bridges

Listed status
Eastbourne station was listed at Grade II on 3 July 1981.

Accidents

On 25 August 1958, a Glasgow to Eastbourne sleeper train collided with an Ore to London Bridge service killing 5, leaving 22 with serious injuries and 18 with minor.

Operating company
Since 2001, all train services have been operated by Southern, formerly South Central.

Former privatised operators
Connex South Central
Virgin CrossCountry

Former long-distance services
Until the late 1960s, long-distance through trains ran from Eastbourne via Brighton to:
Birkenhead Woodside via Redhill, Reading, Oxford, Birmingham Snow Hill and Shrewsbury
Sheffield Victoria via Rugby Central, Loughborough Central and Nottingham Victoria
Walsall via Birmingham New Street and Coventry.
An overnight train also ran from Glasgow Central.

Long-distance services again ran between 1988 and 1996, branded InterCity Holidaymaker. Between 1996 and 1997, Virgin CrossCountry ran a Saturday-only service to Glasgow Central in the morning and Manchester Piccadilly in the afternoon.

Former local services

Until 14 June 1965, a local service from Eastbourne ran via the Cuckoo Line to Tunbridge Wells West and later to Tonbridge. Between 15 June 1965 and 9 September 1968 a shuttle service ran to Hailsham.

Services 

The typical off-peak service from the station is:
2tph (trains per hour) to London Victoria via the East Coastway line (both semi-fast)
2tph to Brighton via the East Coastway Line (both semi-fast)
1tph to Ashford International via the East Coastway Line and Marshlink line (stopping)
1tph to Ore via the East Coastway Line (1 fast 1 stopping)
1tph to Hastings (fast)

There are additional peak services to London Bridge.

On Sunday the typical service is:

1tph to London Victoria (stopping)
1tph to Brighton (stopping)
1tph to Ashford International (fast)
1tph to Ore (stopping)

Facilities 
Ticket office
Automatic ticket barriers
Car park (100+ spaces)
Pick up & drop off zone
Toilets
Telephones
Cash machines
Shops & cafes, including: a Subway, a WHSmith, a barber's, a florist and a coffee shop
NHS Health Centre
Taxi rank
Bus stop (Eastbourne's main bus terminus is a 2-minute walk from the station)
National Express coach stop
Sheltered seating around the whole station
Passenger lounge
Bicycle storage

Future plans 
This would allow trains on the East Coastway line to bypass Eastbourne, saving time on journeys to Hastings and Ashford International.

Stones Cross Halt Station -( Langney Station ). 

The halt was situated between Polegate and Hastings. The station closed on 7 July 1935. There was a petition raised by the Liberal Democrats to reopen the station as Langney station, but the campaign was called off.

However, these plans look to have been revived and Eastbourne council leader David Tutt said, “One issue that I am pressing for as part of this work is the inclusion of a new station at Stone Cross.”

See also
Listed buildings in Eastbourne

References 

Buildings and structures in Eastbourne
Railway stations in East Sussex
DfT Category C1 stations
Former London, Brighton and South Coast Railway stations
Railway stations in Great Britain opened in 1849
Railway stations in Great Britain closed in 1866
Railway stations in Great Britain opened in 1866
Railway stations served by Govia Thameslink Railway
1849 establishments in England
Grade II listed buildings in East Sussex
Grade II listed railway stations